Lewis Creek may refer to:

Streams
Lewis Creek (San Lorenzo Creek) in California.
Lewis Creek (Idaho)
Lewis Creek (Flathead River tributary), a stream in Montana
Lewis Creek (Susquehanna River tributary), a stream in Pennsylvania
Lewis Creek (Batavia Kill tributary), a stream in New York

Populated places
Lewis Creek, Indiana

See also
Lewis Run (disambiguation)